Shaun Hopkins (born 18 April 1977) is an Australian cyclist, who piloted vision impaired tandem cyclist Ben Demery throughout his career. His father and relatives of his mother were competitive cyclists. He began competitive cycling in 1985 and his first national competition was in 1995. He won a silver medal in the sprint and a bronze medal in the 1 km time trial at his first international competition, the 2006 IPC Cycling World Championships. In the next year's UCI Para-cycling Track World Championships, he won silver medals in both the sprint and the 1 km time trial. At the 2008 Beijing Games, he won two silver medals in the Men's Sprint B VI 1–3 and Men's 1 km Time Trial B VI 1–3 events.

He manages a bike store and lives in the Sydney suburb of Fairfield.

References

Paralympic cyclists of Australia
Paralympic sighted guides
Australian male cyclists
Cyclists at the 2008 Summer Paralympics
Medalists at the 2008 Summer Paralympics
Paralympic silver medalists for Australia
Paralympic medalists in cycling
Cyclists from Sydney
1977 births
Living people